Alma Mater is the sole studio album by English post-punk band Stockholm Monsters, released in September 1984 by Factory Records. It was produced by Peter Hook of Joy Division and New Order.

Critical reception

In a retrospective review for AllMusic, critic Stewart Mason called the album, "a terribly satisfying record that was all but ignored at the time of its release but sounds absolutely prescient in hindsight."

American band the Mountain Goats listed the album in their feature "Ten Records That Render Life Bearable" for Pitchfork, calling it the "best album ever".

Track listing

Personnel
Credits are adapted from the Alma Mater liner notes.

Technical
 Peter Hook – producer
 CJ – engineer
 Mike Johnson – engineer

Artwork
 Trevor Johnson – sleeve design and lettering

References

External links
 

1984 debut albums
Factory Records albums
New wave albums by English artists
Post-punk albums by English artists